Bacton is a village and civil parish in Norfolk, England. Besides the village of Bacton, the parish includes the nearby settlements of Bacton Green, Broomholm, Keswick and Pollard Street. It also includes Edingthorpe, which was added to Bacton civil parish under the County of Norfolk Review Order, 1935.

The seaside village, whose name is derived from 'Bacca's farm/settlement', is located on the North Norfolk coast between Mundesley (a blue flag beach) and Walcott, Norfolk. Bacton is known for its very quiet sandy beaches offering miles of walking along the beach and cliffs. The England Coast Path passes through the village and also the Paston Way long-distance footpath linking Cromer and North Walsham.

In the east of the parish can be found the ruined Cluniac Bromholm Priory.

For the purposes of local government, the parish falls within the district of North Norfolk.

Amenities in the village include: a village shop, a hotel, two cafes, a Chinese restaurant and kebab house, as well as a recreation ground. In addition there are several caravan parks and estates consisting of privately owned holiday chalets, giving holidaymakers access to the beach.  During the First World War there was also an airfield located nearby, RAF Bacton.

Coastal erosion 
The village and adjoining coastline has extensive sea defences, erected to prevent coastal erosion. Part of this sea wall in nearby Walcott, Norfolk was damaged in the storm surge in December 2013, which caused damage to several caravans and chalets.

North of Bacton lies the village of Paston where the Bacton Gas Terminal is located. In July 2019 a scheme commenced to deposit almost two million cubic metres of sand, forming a  artificial dune. Costing £20 million, the scheme will protect the gas terminal, as well as the villages of Bacton and Walcott. The sea defences are expected to protect the area for between 15 and 20 years.

Bacton Gas Terminal

The Bacton Gas Terminal is at one end of a gas pipeline connecting England to the Netherlands. The pipeline runs from a compressor station at the Balgzand Gas Plant at Den Helder, North Holland, to a coastal terminal near Bacton. It began to be laid in July 2006 and became operational on 1 December 2006.

War Memorial
Bacton War Memorial takes the form of a stone cross in St. Andrew's Churchyard. It commemorates the following from the First World War: 
 Lieutenant-Colonel Arthur P. Mack (1863-1916), 9th Battalion, Suffolk Regiment
 Lieutenant Jack C. Barnes (d.1915), Plymouth Battalion, Royal Naval Division
 Lieutenant Harold S. F. Cozens (1889-1914), 1st Battalion, East Yorkshire Regiment
 Sergeant Cyril R. Leathes (d.1915), 9th Battalion, Royal Norfolk Regiment
 Gunner Charles Punchard (1886-1917), 291st Siege Battery, Royal Garrison Artillery
 Private Edward H. Denton (d.1917), 905th Maintenance Company, Royal Army Service Corps
 Private Henry J. Allison (d.1917), 6th Battalion, Royal East Kent Regiment
 Private Arthur W. Noad (1893-1915), 2nd Battalion, Lincolnshire Regiment
 Private Arthur Bean (1885-1916), 10th Battalion, Lincolnshire Regiment
 Private Marshall F. Gotts (d.1916), 9th Battalion, Royal Norfolk Regiment
 Deck-hand Christopher West (d.1916), HM Drifter Tuberose
 William Daniels

References

http://kepn.nottingham.ac.uk/map/place/Norfolk/Bacton

External links
 
 Information from Genuki Norfolk on Bacton
 
 Village News - local newsletter for Bacton, Edingthorpe, Ridlington and Witton
 Bacton Beach House with photos of the area
 The Leas Beach Park with photos of Bacton beach, fossils found on the beach and the surrounding area

Villages in Norfolk
Populated coastal places in Norfolk
Civil parishes in Norfolk
North Norfolk